Tim Pritlove (born 25 November 1967 in Gehrden, Germany) is a British/German podcaster, media artist and discordianist. He lives and works in Berlin. 

Pritlove studied computer science but never graduated. From 1998 to 2005 he was the main organizer of the Chaos Communication Congress and the Chaos Communication Camps. Also, until 2006 he was in charge as managing director of the "Chaos Computer Club Veranstaltungs GmbH". He also filled a central role in the Chaos Computer Club, where he is settled as a member.

As discordianist Pritlove appeared under the pseudonym Theodor Prinz. With this name he blogged until March 2008 in the MobileMacs blog. Since the beginning of April 2008 he is blogging at MobileMacs by his civic name.

Media-art 
At the beginning of the 1990s Pritlove belonged to the developers of the first interactive, telephone based communication platform Die Villa. 
He is coordinator and co-developer of the Project Blinkenlights. In the last years he was a scientific assistant in the Institut für zeitbasierte Medien at the Berlin University of the Arts. In 1996 he founded the first T-shirt label of the hacker culture named interhemd modebewusstseinserweiterung.

Podcasting 
Pritlove was involved with Chaosradio, a radio show the CCC runs with Radio Fritz. He later spun off Chaosradio Express (which was renamed into CRE: Technik, Kultur, Gesellschaft in December 2011), Chaosradio Express International and Chaos TV, as podcasts. Additionally he writes his own weblog called The Lunatic Fringe.

He is involved in the production of several, predominantly German podcasts, as well as the English podcast "Newz of the World". His podcasts are often focused on technology, such as Raumzeit he produced for the ESA.

In 2014 Pritlove was one of the most popular German bloggers.

Personal life 
Born British citizen, motivated by Brexit, Pritlove applied for German citizenship, which was granted on 17 October 2018.

References

External links

 Pritlove's Weblog „The Lunatic Fringe“
 Freakshow podcast (german)
 Article about Tim Pritlove in the Indian daily news The Hindu
 Podcast: CRE: Technik, Kultur, Gesellschaft (formerly known as Chaosradio Express) (german)

German artists
German podcasters
1967 births
Living people
Members of Chaos Computer Club
Discordians